Hamilton Beach may refer to:

 Hamilton Beach, Queens, a neighborhood in New York City
 Hamilton Beach station, a former station in Hamilton Beach, Queens
 Hamilton Beach Brands, a manufacturer of home appliances and commercial equipment